Fumihiro Himori (日森文尋 Himori Fumihiro; December 3, 1948 – June 9, 2022) was a Japanese politician and member of the House of Representatives for the Social Democratic Party.

Biography 
Himori attended Saitama Prefectural Kasukabe High School and graduated from Chuo University in economics.

In 1971 he worked as an official in Yonoshi (now Saitama). In 1979 he became the Saitama Land Committee chairperson of the Japan Socialist Youth Alliance. In 1983 he served his fourth term as a city council member of Yonoshi's socialist party.

In the 2000 Japanese general election, Himori ran for 13th district in Saitama and lost, but won his first election at the Proportional North Kanto block. He was defeated in the 2003 Japanese general election, as well as the 2004 Japanese House of Councillors election. He ran as an independent candidate in the North Kanto block in the 2005 Japanese general election and won. In December 2007 he took office as chairperson of party parliamentary countermeasure chairperson at the Social Democratic Party convention. He lost in the 2009 Japanese general election. After he lost the 2010 Japanese House of Councillors election, he retired from Japanese politics.

Upon his visit to North Korea in 2017, he received a 1st Class Order of Friendship.

References 

1948 births
2022 deaths
Politicians from Saitama Prefecture
Chuo University alumni
Members of the House of Representatives (Japan)
Social Democratic Party (Japan) politicians
21st-century Japanese politicians